The Kombe language, or Ngumbi, is a Coastal Bantu language spoken by the Kombe people of Equatorial Guinea, one of the Ndowe peoples of the coast. It is mutually intelligible with Yasa.

References 

 
Sawabantu languages
Languages of Equatorial Guinea